is a single released by Gackt on August 30, 2000 under Nippon Crown. "Saikai ~Story~" is a re-recording of the mostly instrumental song from the extended play Mizérable (titled "Story"). It peaked at seventh place on the Oricon weekly chart and charted for six weeks. The song is used as the ending theme of the TV variety show Hot Pants (ホットパンツ).

Track listing

References

2000 singles
Gackt songs
2000 songs